Richard Mather (1596–1669) was a Puritan minister in colonial Boston.

Other people named Richard Mather include:

 Richard B. Mather (1913–2014), American sinologist
 Richard Henry Mather (1835–1890), American professor of Greek
 Richard "Dick" Mather (1941–1997), Canadian politician

See also 
 Richard Mathers